Cloak of Mystery is an American anthology television series.<ref>Terrace, Vincent. Encyclopedia of Television Shows, 1925 through 2007 (Jefferson, North Carolina: McFarland & Co., 2008), p.289.</ref>

It was broadcast by NBC, recycling programs originally telecast on The Alcoa Theatre and The General Electric Theater.

 Notes 

 Sources 
Terrace, Vincent. Encyclopedia of Television Shows, 1925 through 2007''. Jefferson, North Carolina: McFarland & Co., 2008.

1960s American anthology television series
1965 American television series debuts
1965 American television series endings
NBC original programming
Black-and-white American television shows
English-language television shows